The Waters of Merom is a Biblical lake ten miles north of the Sea of Galilee, formed by the River Jordan. It was mentioned in Book of Joshua as the site of the Battle of the Waters of Merom where the alliance of Canaanite kings under Jabin met and were defeated during Joshua's conquest of Canaan.

The Waters of Merom were previously thought to be Lake Hula, but this is disputed and the name was more likely to apply to a spring or stream in the area.

See also

Hula Valley

References

Places in the deuterocanonical books
Hula Valley